Mikhail Yakovlevich Yevrayev (born 21 April 1971) is a Russian statesman and acting Governor of Yaroslavl Oblast.

Biography
Mikhail Yevrayev was born on 21 April 1971 in Leningrad, Russian SFSR (now Saint Petersburg). Until 1988, Yevrayev worked as a turner at the Kalinin Plant.

In 1988, he enrolled at Leningrad Financial-Economic Institute, where he studied at the faculty of "scientific labour organisation" (graduated in 1993). During his student years he also was a member of a construction brigade, which worked on the Baikal–Amur Mainline. In 1991-2000, Yevrayev worked as an expert, head of finance and legal and director for economy and finance at an unspecified firm. In 1999, Yevrayev graduated Saint Petersburg State University with a degree in law.

Yevrayev joined Yabloko in 1999. Since 2001, Yevrayev served as chairman of the party's Vasilyevsky Island territorial organisation. In 2002 he was elected as vice chairman for economic policy of Yabloko Saint Petersburg office. Simultaneously, Yevrayev was a member of expert council of Yabloko faction in the State Duma.

In 2000-2004 Mikhail Yevrayev worked in the Fund of Economic and Political Researches "EPITsentr", led by State Duma member Igor Artemyev. In EPITsentr Yevrayev led the department of social-economic programs, where he took part in development and implementation of anti-crisis programs in Artyom, Tomsk and Baltiysk. Mikhail Yevrayev also developed a platform for Artemyev's 2000 gubernatorial campaign in Saint Petersburg. 

In March 2004 Igor Artemyev was appointed as Head of Federal Antimonopoly Service. Mikhail Yevrayev also joined FAS in April 2004, where he worked as Head of Department for Monitoring and Oversight in Real Estate, Local Monopolies, and Communal Utilities. In January 2007 Yevrayev was appointed as Head of Department for Monitoring of Government Contracting. 

In 2006-2012 Mikhail Yevrayev was a member of the Federal Bureau of Yabloko.

On 11 October 2012 Mikhail Yevrayev was appointed as Deputy Minister of Regional Development of Russia, where he worked for just 2 months, as on 24 December 2012 he became Deputy Minister of Communications and Mass Media of Russia. In the Ministry of Communications Yevrayev oversaw the Russian Post and took part in creation of Post Bank, development of GIS ZhKKh, GIS "Independent Operator", register of national software, optimisation of departmental enterprises' procurement activities and drafting legislation in mobile number transfer between operators (MNP). On 24 July 2018 Yevrayev left the Ministry.

On 27 November 2018 Mikhail Yevrayev returned to the Federal Antimonopoly Service, where he was appointed as Deputy Head of FAS. In FAS Yevrayev oversaw government contracting, the division he worked in during 2007-2012. In November 2020 Igor Artemyev resigned as the Head of Federal Antimonopoly Service and was replaced by Maksim Shaskolsky. During cabinet reshuffle Mikhail Yevrayev resigned from the post of Deputy Head of FAS on 12 December 2012, at his own request.

Several staff appointments on 12 October 2021 resulted in Anatoly Seryshev becoming Presidential Envoy to the Siberian Federal District (the position was vacant since April 2021), while Seryshev's post as Assistant to the President was given to Yaroslavl Oblast Governor Dmitry Mironov. The vacated post of Governor of Yaroslavl Oblast was awarded to Mikhail Yevrayev, who graduated so called "school of governors" in 2019. Mikhail Yevrayev also became the first member of Yabloko to be appointed as Russian governor.

Personal life
Yevrayev is married and has a daughter and a son.

Among Mikhail Yevrayev's hobbies are chess, boxing and mountain skiing.

Honours
 Medal of the Order "For Merit to the Fatherland" II class (2008)
 Letter of Gratitude of the Government of Russia (2011)
 Active State Advisor II class (2017)

Notes

References

Living people
1971 births
21st-century Russian politicians
Politicians from Saint Petersburg
Governors of Yaroslavl Oblast
Yabloko politicians